Tick-borne encephalitis vaccine is a vaccine used to prevent tick-borne encephalitis (TBE). The disease is most common in Central and Eastern Europe, and Northern Asia. More than 87% of people who receive the vaccine develop immunity. It is not useful following the bite of an infected tick. It is given by injection into a muscle.

The World Health Organization (WHO) recommends immunizing all people in areas where the disease is common. Otherwise the vaccine is just recommended for those who are at high risk. Three doses are recommended followed by additional doses every three to five years. The vaccines can be used in people more than one or three years of age depending on the formulation. The vaccine appears to be safe during pregnancy.

Serious side effects are very uncommon. Minor side effects may include fever, and redness and pain at the site of injection. Older formulations were more commonly associated with side effects.

The first vaccine against TBE was developed in 1937. It is on the World Health Organization's List of Essential Medicines. The vaccine was approved for medical use in the United States in August 2021.

Medical uses
In the United States, tick-borne encephalitis vaccine is indicated for active immunization to prevent tick-borne encephalitis (TBE) in individuals one year of age and older.

The efficacy of these vaccines has been well documented. They have also been shown to protect mice from a lethal challenge with several TBE-virus isolates obtained over a period of more than 30 years from all over Europe and the Asian part of the former Soviet Union. In addition, it has been demonstrated that antibodies induced by vaccination of human volunteers neutralized all tested isolates.

Pregnancy and breastfeeding
The vaccine appears to be safe during pregnancy, but because of insufficient data the vaccine is only recommended during pregnancy and breastfeeding when it is considered urgent to achieve protection against TBE infection and after careful consideration of risks versus benefits.

Schedule
Two to three doses are recommended depending on the formulation. Typically one to three months should occur between the first doses followed by five to twelve months before the final dose. Additional doses are then recommended every three to five years. A study from 2006 suggests that the FSME-Immun/Ticovac and Encepur are interchangeable for booster vaccination, but cautions against change during the primary immunization course.

History
The first vaccine against TBE was prepared in 1937 in the brains of mice. Some 20 years later TBE vaccines derived from cell cultures (chicken embryo fibroblast cells) were developed and used for active immunization in humans in the former Soviet Union. Later, a purified, inactivated virus vaccine was developed which proved to be more immunogenic than previous TBE vaccines.

Society and culture

Economics 

Brand names 
Brand names of the vaccines include Encepur N, FSME-Immun CC and Ticovac, Encevir-Neo, Klesh-E-Vak.

References

External links
 

Inactivated vaccines
Vaccines
World Health Organization essential medicines (vaccines)
Wikipedia medicine articles ready to translate